Pyruvate dehydrogenase (NADP+)  is an enzyme that should not be confused with Pyruvate dehydrogenase (acetyltransferase) .

It catalyzes the following reaction:
Pyruvate + Coenzyme A + NADP+ ⇒ acetyl-CoA + NADPH + H+ + CO2

References

Further reading

External links 

 EC 1.2.1.51 IUBMB Enzyme Nomenclature at chem.qmul.ac.uk
 EC 1.2.1.51 - pyruvate dehydrogenase (NADP+) at Brenda-enzymes.org
 ENZYME entry: EC 1.2.1.51 at Enzyme.expasy.org

Autoantigens
EC 1.2.1